Watermelon Peak is a  summit located in Banff National Park, in the Canadian Rockies of Alberta, Canada. Its nearest higher peak is Deluc Peak,  to the east.


History
Watermelon Peak was named in 1966 by William L. Putnam, member of the first ascent party, which carried a four-kilogram watermelon to the summit, and consumed it there. The July 1966 first ascent party included David Michael, W.V.G. Matthews, William L. Putnam, M. Stearns, and L.R. Wallace. However, the name is not officially recognized by the Geographical Names Board of Canada.

Geology
Like other mountains in Banff Park, Watermelon Peak is composed of sedimentary rock laid down during the Precambrian to Jurassic periods. Formed in shallow seas, this sedimentary rock was pushed east and over the top of younger rock during the Laramide orogeny.

Climate
Based on the Köppen climate classification, Watermelon Peak is located in a subarctic climate zone with cold, snowy winters, and mild summers. Winter temperatures can drop below −20 °C with wind-chill factors below −30 °C. Precipitation runoff from Watermelon Peak drains into the Bow River and Siffleur River which are both tributaries of the Saskatchewan River.

See also
List of mountains in the Canadian Rockies
Geography of Alberta
Geology of the Rocky Mountains

Gallery

References

Notes

External links
 Parks Canada web site: Banff National Park
 Climbing Watermelon Peak: Golden Scrambles

Three-thousanders of Alberta
Mountains of Banff National Park
Alberta's Rockies
Canadian Rockies